Sim Teck Yi is a Singaporean footballer who plays for Home United FC as a defender. He started his career with Balestier Khalsa in 2012.

Career
Sim began his professional footballer in 2012 where he was in the Balestier Khalsa squad. After a year, Sim decided to sign for Home United in 2013. He later was then transferred to the Under-23 development team, Young Lions. After 2 years in the club, Sim returned to the Home United for the 2016 S.League campaign.

References

Singaporean footballers
Singaporean sportspeople of Chinese descent
1991 births
Living people
Association football defenders
Home United FC players
Young Lions FC players